Lancashire (abbreviated Lancs.) is a ceremonial county in North West England. The administrative centre is Preston, while Lancaster is the county town. Many of these places still identify strongly with the county, particularly in areas of Greater Manchester (such as Oldham and Bury) where Lancashire is still used as part of the postal address. The population of Lancashire in the 1971 census (before local government changes) was 5,118,405, making it the most heavily populated county in the United Kingdom at the time (other than Greater London, which had only been created in 1965).

The history of Lancashire begins with its founding in the 12th century. In the Domesday Book of 1086, some of its lands were treated as part of Yorkshire.  The land that lay between the Ribble and Mersey, Inter Ripam et Mersam, was included in the returns for Cheshire. When its boundaries were established, it bordered Cumberland, Westmorland, Yorkshire, and Cheshire.

Lancashire emerged as a major commercial and industrial region during the Industrial Revolution. Liverpool, Salford and Manchester grew into its largest cities, with economies built around the docks and the cotton mills respectively. These cities dominated global trade and the birth of modern industrial capitalism.  The county contained several mill towns and the collieries of the Lancashire Coalfield.  By the 1830s, approximately 85% of all cotton manufactured worldwide was processed in Lancashire. Accrington, Blackburn, Bolton, Burnley, Bury, Chorley, Colne, Darwen, Manchester, Nelson, Oldham, Preston, Rochdale and Wigan were major cotton mill towns during this time. Blackpool was a centre for tourism for the inhabitants of Lancashire's mill towns, particularly during wakes week.

The historic county was subject to a significant boundary reform in 1974 which created the current ceremonial county and removed Liverpool and Manchester, and most of their surrounding conurbations to form the metropolitan and ceremonial counties of Merseyside and Greater Manchester. The detached northern part of Lancashire in the Lake District, including the Furness Peninsula and Cartmel, was merged with Cumberland and Westmorland to form Cumbria. Lancashire lost 709 square miles of land to other counties, about two fifths of its original area, although it did gain some land from the West Riding of Yorkshire.

Today the ceremonial county borders Cumbria to the north, Greater Manchester and Merseyside to the south, and North and West Yorkshire to the east; with a coastline on the Irish Sea to the west.

History

Before the county
During Roman times the area was part of the Brigantes tribal area in the military zone of Roman Britain. The towns of Manchester, Lancaster, Ribchester, Burrow, Elslack and Castleshaw grew around Roman forts. In the centuries after the Roman withdrawal in 410AD the northern parts of the county probably formed part of the Brythonic kingdom of Rheged, a successor entity to the Brigantes tribe. During the mid-8th century, the area was incorporated into the Anglo-Saxon Kingdom of Northumbria from the north of the River Ribble and the Kingdom of Mercia from the south, which both became parts of England in the 10th century.

In the Domesday Book, land between the Ribble and Mersey were known as "Inter Ripam et Mersam" and included in the returns for Cheshire. Although some historians consider this to mean south Lancashire was then part of Cheshire, it is by no means certain.  It is also claimed that the territory to the north formed part of the West Riding of Yorkshire.

Early history

The county was established in 1182, and came to be bordered by Cumberland, Westmorland, Yorkshire, and Cheshire. It was divided into the hundreds of Amounderness, Blackburn, Leyland, Lonsdale, Salford and West Derby. Lonsdale was further partitioned into Lonsdale North, the detached part north of the sands of Morecambe Bay including Furness and Cartmel, and Lonsdale South.

Victorian era to late 20th century
Since the Victorian era, Lancashire has had multiple reforms of local government. In 1889, the administrative county of Lancashire was created, covering the greater part of the county. Multiple county boroughs were outside the county council control; Barrow-in-Furness, Blackburn, Bolton, Bootle, Burnley, Bury, Liverpool, Manchester, Oldham, Preston, Rochdale, Salford, St. Helens, and Wigan. The area served by the Lord-Lieutenant (termed now a ceremonial county) covered the entirety of the administrative county and the county boroughs. It expanded whenever boroughs annexed areas in neighbouring counties such as Wythenshawe in Manchester south of the River Mersey and from Cheshire, and southern Warrington. It did not cover the western part of Todmorden, where the ancient border between Lancashire and Yorkshire passes through the middle of the town.

During the 20th century, the county became increasingly urban with Warrington (1900), Blackpool (1904) and Southport (1905) becoming county boroughs, with many boundary extensions. The borders around the Manchester area were particularly complicated, with narrow protrusions of the administrative county between the county boroughs – Lees urban district formed a detached part of the administrative county, between Oldham county borough and the West Riding of Yorkshire.

The administrative county was also the most populous of its type outside London, with a population of 2,280,359 in 1961. By the census of 1971, the population of Lancashire and its county boroughs had reached 5,129,416, making it the most populous geographic county in the UK.

Post-1974

On 1 April 1974, under the Local Government Act 1972, the southern part of the geographic county was transferred to the two newly established metropolitan counties of Merseyside and Greater Manchester.
The new county of Cumbria incorporated into the Furness exclave and otherwise newly exclaves were incorporated into Cheshire.

The new metropolitan boroughs of Liverpool, Knowsley, St. Helens and Sefton were formed in Merseyside. In Greater Manchester the new metropolitan boroughs were Bury, Bolton, Manchester, Oldham (part), Rochdale, Salford, Tameside (part), Trafford (part) and Wigan. Newly created Warrington borough and parts of Halton borough, south of the new Merseyside and Greater Manchester, were transferred to the administrative county of Cheshire. 

The former urban districts of Barnoldswick and Earby, Bowland Rural District and the parishes of Bracewell and Brogden and Salterforth from Skipton Rural District in the West Riding of Yorkshire became part of the administrative county of Lancashire. One parish, Simonswood, was transferred from the borough of Knowsley in Merseyside to the district of West Lancashire in 1994. In 1998 Blackpool and Blackburn with Darwen became unitary authorities (reform equivalent of a county borough), removing them from the non-metropolitan county but not from the ceremonial county.

Geography

Divisions and environs
Lancashire, the shire county controlled by the county council is divided into local government districts, Burnley, Chorley, Fylde, Hyndburn, Lancaster, Pendle, Preston, Ribble Valley, Rossendale, South Ribble, West Lancashire, and Wyre.

Blackpool and Blackburn with Darwen are unitary authorities that do not come under county council control. The Lancashire Constabulary covers the shire county and the unitary authorities. The ceremonial county, including the unitary authorities, borders Cumbria, North Yorkshire, West Yorkshire, Greater Manchester and Merseyside in the North West England region.

Geology, landscape, and ecology

The highest point of the modern county council area is Gragareth, near Whernside, which reaches a height of 627 m (2,057 ft). Green Hill near Gragareth has also been cited as the "county" top. of the modern council area. However, the highest point in the historic County Palatine is Coniston Old Man in the Lake District at 803 m (2,634 ft), which is regarded as the County Top by those who feel the Local Government Act 1972 (enacted 1974) did not abolish the historic county borders of Lancashire.

Lancashire rivers drain westwards from the Pennines into the Irish Sea. Rivers in Lancashire include the Ribble, Wyre and Lune. Their tributaries are the Calder, Darwen, Douglas, Hodder, and Yarrow. The Irwell has its source in Lancashire.

To the west of the county are the West Lancashire Coastal Plain and the Fylde coastal plain north of the Ribble Estuary. Further north is Morecambe Bay. Apart from the coastal resorts, these areas are largely rural with the land devoted to vegetable crops. In the northwest corner of the county, straddling the border with Cumbria, is the Arnside and Silverdale Area of Outstanding Natural Beauty (AONB), characterised by its limestone pavements and home to the Leighton Moss nature reserve.

To the east of the county are upland areas leading to the Pennines. North of the Ribble is Beacon Fell Country Park and the Forest of Bowland, another AONB. Much of the lowland in this area is devoted to dairy farming and cheesemaking, whereas the higher ground is more suitable for sheep, and the highest ground is uncultivated moorland. The valleys of the River Ribble and its tributary the Calder form a large gap to the west of the Pennines, overlooked by Pendle Hill. Most of the larger Lancashire towns are in these valleys South of the Ribble are the West Pennine Moors and the Forest of Rossendale where former cotton mill towns are in deep valleys. The Lancashire Coalfield, largely in modern-day Greater Manchester, extended into Merseyside and to Ormskirk, Chorley, Burnley and Colne in Lancashire.

Settlements

Much of the southern half of Lancashire and its coast is heavily urbanised especially around the settlements adjoining Greater Manchester and the county's largest settlements of Preston, Blackburn, Lancaster, Blackpool and Burnley.
The towns of Nelson, Brierfield, Colne and Burnley form a large urban area which covers both the Burnley and Pendle Boroughs. Rawtenstall, Bacup, Accrington and Haslingden form an urban area which is almost contiguous with the nearby borough of Blackburn with Darwen and the Greater Manchester boroughs of Bolton, Bury and Rochdale. Parts of West Lancashire form part of the Wigan urban area (Wigan being also in Greater Manchester) which includes Skelmersdale. Central Lancashire forms an urban area around the city of Preston and the towns of Penwortham, Leyland and Chorley. Lancaster forms an urban area with Heysham and Morecambe. 

Lancashire contains green belt interspersed throughout the county, covering much of the southern districts and towns throughout the Ribble Valley, West Lancashire, and The Fylde coastal plains to prevent convergence with the nearby Merseyside and Greater Manchester conurbations. Further pockets control the expansion of Lancaster, and surround the Blackpool urban area, as part of the western edge of the North West Green Belt. It was first drawn up in the 1950s. All the county's districts contain some portion of the belt, the portion by Burnley also abutting the Forest of Pendle Area of Outstanding Natural Beauty.

Settlements

The table below divides settlements by their district. Each district has an administrative centre; taking the largest town's name or the geographical area.

Notes:

Some settlements which were historically part of the county now fall under the counties of West Yorkshire, Cheshire, Merseyside, Greater Manchester and Cumbria:

Boundary changes before 1974 include:
Todmorden, split between Lancashire and Yorkshire then entirely to West Riding of Yorkshire in 1889
Mossley, split between Lancashire, Yorkshire and Cheshire then entirely to Lancashire in 1889
Stalybridge, entirely to Cheshire in 1889
Areas such as Wythenshawe and Latchford, former county boroughs of Manchester and Warrington both extended south of the Mersey into historic Cheshire
areas such as Reddish and the Heatons (Heaton Chapel, Heaton Mersey, Heaton Moor and Heaton Norris), former county borough of Stockport extended north into historic Lancashire.

Governance
They are three areas to have the name Lancashire: the smallest of these is the non-metropolitan county which has a county council and districts; the ceremonial county which includes the latter, Blackburn with Darwen and the Borough of Blackpool; the final area is the has the most area of the three and is the oldest.

Non-metropolitan

The non-metropolitan county is administered on a two-tier system. It is governed by the Lancashire County Council and twelve district councils. 

Lancashire County Council is based in County Hall in Preston. Built as a home for the county administration, the Quarter Sessions and Lancashire Constabulary, it opened on 14 September 1882.

Local elections for 84 councillors from 84 divisions are held every four years. The Conservative Party currently form a majority on Lancashire County Council.

Ceremonial

The ceremonial county is defined in the Lieutenancies Act 1997 as consisting of two unitary authority boroughs - Blackpool and Blackburn with Darwen - and the non-metropolitan county. The Lord Lieutenant of Lancashire is the King's personal representative in the ceremonial county and has been Charles Kay-Shuttleworth since 1997. 

The High Sheriff of Lancashire is the King's judicial representative, a position which is a largely ceremonial and changes holder each year. High Shrievalties are the oldest secular titles under the Crown, in England and Wales. The High Sheriff is the representative of the monarch and is the "Keeper of The King's Peace" in the county, executing judgements of the High Court.

Following similar moves by other counties, in 2020, councils in the county proposed a reform to establish a combined authority (to provide strategic priorities) and three unitary authorities with roughly equal population. The three new council areas would be:

Historic duchy

The duchy area (also known as a county palatine or historic county) includes most of the other definitions of the county as well as areas of all its neighbouring ceremonial counties and of Cheshire. The Duchy of Lancaster is one of two royal duchies in England, the other being Cornwall. It has landholdings throughout the region and elsewhere, operating as a property company, but also exercising the right of the Crown in the County Palatine of Lancaster. While the administrative boundaries changed in the 1970s, the county palatine boundaries remain the same as the historic boundaries.

The Duchy administers bona vacantia within the County Palatine, receiving the property of persons who die intestate and where the legal ownership cannot be ascertained. There is no separate Duke of Lancaster; the title merged into the Crown with the ascension of Henry V. Rather, the Duchy is administered by the King in Right of the Duchy of Lancaster. A separate court system for the county palatine was abolished by Courts Act 1971. A particular form of The Loyal Toast, 'The King, Duke of Lancaster' is in regular use in the county palatine. Lancaster serves as the county town of the county palatine.

The Chancellor of the Duchy of Lancaster is a government minister. Formally, the Chancellor is responsible for administration of the estates and rents of the Duchy, but in practice the post is treated as a high-ranking minister without portfolio.

Economy

Lancashire in the 19th century was a major centre of economic activity, and hence one of wealth. Activities included coal mining, textile production, particularly that which used cotton, and fishing. Preston Docks, an industrial port is now disused. Lancashire was historically the location of the port of Liverpool while Barrow-in-Furness is famous for shipbuilding.

As of 2013, the largest private sector industry is the defence industry with BAE Systems Military Air Solutions division based in Warton on the Fylde coast. The division operates a manufacturing site in Samlesbury. Other defence firms include BAE Systems Global Combat Systems in Chorley, Ultra Electronics in Fulwood and Rolls-Royce plc in Barnoldswick.

The nuclear power industry has a plant at Springfields, Salwick operated by Westinghouse and Heysham nuclear power station is operated by British Energy. Other major manufacturing firms include Leyland Trucks, a subsidiary of Paccar building the DAF truck range.

Other companies with a major presence in Lancashire include:

 Airline Network, an internet travel company with headquarters in Preston.
 Baxi, a heating equipment manufacturer has a large manufacturing site in Bamber Bridge.
 Crown Paints, a major paint manufacturer based in Darwen.
 Dr. Oetker, an international food processing company, has a factory in Leyland that produces frozen pizza mostly under the Chicago Town and Ristorante brands.
 Enterprise plc, one of the UK's leading support services based in Leyland.
 Hanson plc, a building supplies company operates the Accrington brick works.
 Hollands Pies, a major manufacturer of baked goods based in Baxenden near Accrington.
 National Savings and Investments, the state-owned savings bank, which offers Premium Bonds and other savings products, has an office in Blackpool.
 Thwaites Brewery, a regional brewery founded in 1807 by Juno Thwaites in Blackburn.
 Xchanging, a company providing business process outsourcing services, with operations in Fulwood.
 AB InBev, a multinational beverage company, brews Budweiser, Stella Artois, Brahma, Bass and Boddingtons in Samlesbury.
 Fisherman's Friend, a confection company, famous for making strong mints and lozenges, based in Fleetwood.

The Foulnaze cockle fishery is in Lytham. It has only opened the coastal cockle beds three times in twenty years; August 2013 was the last of these openings.

Enterprise zone
The creation of Lancashire Enterprise Zone was announced in 2011. It was launched in April 2012, based at the airfields owned by BAE Systems in Warton and Samlesbury. Development is coordinated by Lancashire Enterprise Partnership, Lancashire County Council and BAE Systems. The first businesses to move into the zone did so in March 2015, at Warton.

In March 2015 the government announced a new enterprise zone would be created at Blackpool Airport, using some airport and adjoining land. Operations at the airport will not be affected.

Economic output

This is a chart of trend of regional gross value added of the non-metropolitan county of Lancashire at basic prices published by the Office for National Statistics with figures in millions of British pounds sterling.

Education

Lancashire has a mostly comprehensive system with four state grammar schools. Not including sixth form colleges, there are 77 state schools (not including Burnley's new schools) and 24 independent schools. The Clitheroe area has secondary modern schools. Sixth form provision is limited at most schools in most districts, with only Fylde and Lancaster districts having mostly sixth forms at schools. The rest depend on FE colleges and sixth form colleges, where they exist. South Ribble has the largest school population and Fylde the smallest (only three schools). Burnley's schools have had a new broom and have essentially been knocked down and started again in 2006. There are many Church of England and Catholic faith schools in Lancashire.

Lancashire is home to four universities: Lancaster University, the University of Central Lancashire, Edge Hill University and the Lancaster campus of the University of Cumbria. Seven colleges offer higher education courses.

Transport

Road

The Lancashire economy relies strongly on the M6 motorway which runs from north to south, past Lancaster and Preston. The M55 connects Preston to Blackpool and is 11.5 miles (18.3 km) long. The M65 motorway from Colne, connects Burnley, Accrington, Blackburn to Preston. The M61 from Preston via Chorley and the M66 starting   inside the county boundary near Edenfield, provide links between Lancashire and Manchester, and the trans-Pennine M62. The M58 crosses the southernmost part of the county from the M6 near Wigan to Liverpool via Skelmersdale.

Other major roads include the east–west A59 between Liverpool in Merseyside and Skipton in North Yorkshire via Ormskirk, Preston and Clitheroe, and the connecting A565 to Southport; the A56 from Ramsbottom to Padiham via Haslingden and from Colne to Skipton; the A585 from Kirkham to Fleetwood; the A666 from the A59 north of Blackburn to Bolton via Darwen; and the A683 from Heysham to Kirkby Lonsdale via Lancaster.

Rail

East-west connections are carried via the East Lancashire Line between Blackpool and  via , Preston,  and Burnley.

Air
Blackpool Airport are no longer operating domestic or international flights, but it is still the home of flying schools, private operators and North West Air Ambulance. Manchester Airport is the main airport in the region. Liverpool John Lennon Airport is nearby, while the closest airport to the Pendle Borough is Leeds Bradford.

There is an operational airfield at Warton near Preston where there is a major assembly and test facility for BAE Systems.

Ferry
Heysham offers ferry services to Ireland and the Isle of Man. As part of its industrial past, Lancashire gave rise to an extensive network of canals, which extend into neighbouring counties. These include the Leeds and Liverpool Canal, Lancaster Canal, Sankey Canal, Bridgewater Canal, Rochdale Canal, Ashton Canal and Manchester Ship Canal.

Bus
Several bus companies run bus services in the Lancashire area serving the main towns and villages in the county with some services running to neighbouring areas, Cumbria, Greater Manchester, Merseyside and West Yorkshire. Some of these include: 
 Stagecoach Merseyside & South Lancashire
 Stagecoach Cumbria & North Lancashire
 Stagecoach Manchester 
 Go North West
 Preston Bus 
 Diamond North West

Demography

The major settlements in the ceremonial county are concentrated on the Fylde coast (the Blackpool Urban Area), and a number of notable settlements along west to east of the M65: including the city of Preston and towns of Blackburn, Darwen, Accrington, Burnley, Padiham, Brierfield, Nelson and Colne. South of Preston are the towns of Leyland and Chorley (which, with Preston, formed Central Lancashire New Town designated in 1970), as well as Penwortham, Skelmersdale and Ormskirk. The north of the county is predominantly rural and sparsely populated, except for the city of Lancaster and the towns of Morecambe and Heysham, the three of which form a large conurbation of almost 100,000 people. Lancashire is home to a significant Asian population, numbering over 70,000 and 6% of the county's population, and concentrated largely in the former cotton mill towns in the south east.

Culture

Symbols 

The Red Rose of Lancaster is the county flower found on the county's heraldic badge and flag. The rose was a symbol of the House of Lancaster, immortalised in the verse "In the battle for England's head/York was white, Lancaster red" (referring to the 15th-century Wars of the Roses). The traditional Lancashire flag, a red rose on a white field, was not officially registered. When an attempt was made to register it with the Flag Institute it was found that it was officially registered by Montrose in Scotland, several hundred years earlier with the Lyon Office. Lancashire's official flag is registered as a red rose on a gold field.

Sport

Cricket 
Lancashire County Cricket Club has been one of the most successful county cricket teams, particularly in the one-day game. It is home to England cricket team members James Anderson and Jos Buttler. The County Ground, Old Trafford, Trafford, has been the home cricket ground of LCCC since 1864.

Local cricket leagues include the Lancashire League, the Central Lancashire League and the North Lancashire and Cumbria League.

Since 2000, the designated ECB Premier League for Lancashire has been the Liverpool and District Cricket Competition.

Football 
Football in Lancashire is governed by the Lancashire County Football Association which, like most county football associations, has boundaries that are aligned roughly with the historic counties. The Manchester Football Association and Liverpool County Football Association respectively operate in Greater Manchester and Merseyside.

Lancashire clubs were prominent in the formation of the Football League in 1888, with the league being officially named at a meeting in Manchester. Of the twelve founder members of the league, six were from Lancashire: Accrington, Blackburn Rovers, Bolton Wanderers, Burnley, Everton, and Preston North End.

The Football League now operates out of Preston. The National Football Museum was founded at Deepdale, Preston in 2001, but moved to Manchester in 2012.

Seven professional full-time teams were based in Lancashire at the start of the 2022-23 season:

 Championship: Blackburn Rovers, Preston North End, Burnley, and Blackpool
 League One: Accrington Stanley, Morecambe and Fleetwood Town 

The county's most prominent football rivalries are the East Lancashire derby between Blackburn Rovers and Burnley, and the West Lancashire derby between Blackpool and Preston North End.

A further nine professional full-time teams lie within the historical borders of Lancashire but outside of the current ceremonial county. These include the Premier League clubs Everton, Liverpool, Manchester City and Manchester United.

Rugby league 

Along with Yorkshire and Cumberland, Lancashire is recognised as the heartland of Rugby League. The county has produced many successful top flight clubs such as St. Helens, Wigan, Warrington, Oldham, Salford and Widnes. The county was once the focal point for many of the sport's professional competitions including the Lancashire League competition which ran from 1895 to 1970, and the Lancashire County Cup which ran until 1993. Rugby League has also seen a representative fixture between Lancashire and Yorkshire contested 89 times since its inception in 1895. In recent times there were several rugby league teams that are based within the ceremonial county which include Blackpool Panthers, East Lancashire Lions, and Blackpool Sea Eagles.

Archery 
There are many archery clubs located within Lancashire. In 2004 Lancashire took the winning title at the Inter-counties championships from Yorkshire who had held it for 7 years.

Wrestling 
Lancashire has a long history of wrestling, developing its own style called Lancashire wrestling, with many clubs that over the years have produced many renowned wrestlers. Some of these have crossed over into the mainstream world of professional wrestling, including Shak Khan, Billy Riley, Davey Boy Smith, William Regal, Wade Barrett and the Dynamite Kid.

Music

Folk music 
Lancashire has a long and highly productive tradition of music making. In the early modern era the county shared in the national tradition of balladry, including perhaps the finest border ballad, "The Ballad of Chevy Chase", thought to have been composed by the Lancashire-born minstrel Richard Sheale. The county was also a common location for folk songs, including "The Lancashire Miller", "Warrington Ale" and "The soldier's farewell to Manchester", while Liverpool, as a major seaport, was the subject of many sea shanties, including "The Leaving of Liverpool" and "Maggie May", beside several local Wassailing songs.<ref name="Gregory2006">D. Gregory, '"The Songs of the People for Me: The Victorian Rediscovery of Lancashire Vernacular Song', Canadian Folk Music/Musique folklorique canadienne, 40 (2006), pp. 12–21.</ref> In the Industrial Revolution changing social and economic patterns helped create new traditions and styles of folk song, often linked to migration and patterns of work. These included processional dances, often associated with rushbearing or the Wakes Week festivities, and types of step dance, most famously clog dancing.G. Boyes, The Imagined Village: Culture, Ideology, and the English Folk Revival (Manchester: Manchester University Press, 1993), 0-71902-914-7, p. 214.

A local pioneer of folk song collection in the first half of the 19th century was Shakespearean scholar James Orchard Halliwell, but it was not until the second folk revival in the 20th century that the full range of song from the county, including industrial folk song, began to gain attention. The county produced one of the major figures of the revival in Ewan MacColl, but also a local champion in Harry Boardman, who from 1965 onwards probably did more than anyone to popularise and record the folk song of the county. Perhaps the most influential folk artists to emerge from the region in the late 20th century were Liverpool folk group The Spinners, and from Manchester folk troubadour Roy Harper and musician, comedian and broadcaster Mike Harding.J, C. Falstaff, 'Roy Harper Longest Running Underground Act', Dirty Linen, 50 (Feb/Mar '94), http://www.dirtylinen.com/feature/50harper.html , 16 February 2009. The region is home to numerous folk clubs, many of them catering to Irish and Scottish folk music. Regular folk festivals include the Fylde Folk Festival at Fleetwood.

 Classical music 
Lancashire had a lively culture of choral and classical music, with very large numbers of local church choirs from the 17th century, leading to the foundation of local choral societies from the mid-18th century, often particularly focused on performances of the music of Handel and his contemporaries. It also played a major part in the development of brass bands which emerged in the county, particularly in the textile and coalfield areas, in the 19th century. The first open competition for brass bands was held at Manchester in 1853, and continued annually until the 1980s. The vibrant brass band culture of the area made an important contribution to the foundation and staffing of the Hallé Orchestra from 1857, the oldest extant professional orchestra in the United Kingdom. The same local musical tradition produced eminent figures such as Sir William Walton (1902–88), son of an Oldham choirmaster and music teacher, Sir Thomas Beecham (1879–1961), born in St. Helens, who began his career by conducting local orchestras and Alan Rawsthorne (1905–71) born in Haslingden. The conductor David Atherton, co-founder of the London Sinfonietta, was born in Blackpool in 1944. Lancashire also produced more populist figures, such as early musical theatre composer Leslie Stuart (1863–1928), born in Southport, who began his musical career as organist of Salford Cathedral.

More recent Lancashire-born composers include Hugh Wood (1932– Parbold), Sir Peter Maxwell Davies (1934–2016, Salford), Sir Harrison Birtwistle (1934–, Accrington), Gordon Crosse (1937–, Bury), John McCabe (1939–2015, Huyton), Roger Smalley (1943–2015, Swinton), Nigel Osborne (1948–, Manchester), Steve Martland (1954–2013, Liverpool), Simon Holt (1958–, Bolton) and Philip Cashian (1963–, Manchester).
The Royal Manchester College of Music was founded in 1893 to provide a northern counterpart to the London musical colleges. It merged with the Northern College of Music (formed in 1920) to form the Royal Northern College of Music in 1972.

 Popular music 

Liverpool, both during its time in Lancashire and after being moved to the new county of Merseyside, has produced a number of successful musicians. This includes pop stars such as Frankie Vaughan and Lita Roza, as well as rock stars such as Billy Fury, who is considered to be one of the most successful British rock and roll stars of all time. Many Lancashire towns had vibrant skiffle scenes in the late 1950s, out of which a culture of beat groups emerged by the early 1960s, particularly around Liverpool and Manchester. It has been estimated that there were at least 350 bands—including the Beatles—active in and around Liverpool during this era, playing ballrooms, concert halls, and clubs. A number of Liverpool performers followed the Beatles into the charts, including Gerry & the Pacemakers, the Searchers, and Cilla Black.

The first musicians to break through in the UK who were not from Liverpool or managed by Beatles manager Brian Epstein were Manchester's Freddie and the Dreamers, with Herman's Hermits and the Hollies also hailing from Manchester. The Beatles led a movement by various beat groups from the region which culminated in the British Invasion of the US, which in turn made a major contribution to the development of modern rock music. After the decline of beat groups in the late 1960s, the centre of rock culture shifted to London, and there were relatively few Lancashire bands who achieved national prominence until the growth of a disco scene and the punk rock revolution in the mid-and-late 1970s.

The towns of Accrington, Burnley, Chorley, Clitheroe, Colne, Lytham St Annes, Morecambe, Nelson, Ormskirk and Skelmersdale as well as the cities of Lancaster and Preston are referenced in the 1991 song, It's Grim Up North by the band the KLF.

 Cuisine 

Lancashire is the origin of the Lancashire hotpot, a casserole dish traditionally made with lamb. Other traditional foods from the area include:

 Black peas, also known as parched peas: popular in Darwen, Bolton and Preston.
 Bury black pudding has long been associated with the county. The most notable brand, Chadwick's Original Bury Black Puddings, are still sold on Bury Market, and are manufactured in Rossendale.
 Butter cake: slice of bread and butter.
 Butter pie: a savoury pie containing potatoes, onion and butter.  Usually associated with Preston.
 Clapbread: a thin oatcake made from unleavened dough cooked on a griddle.
 Chorley cakes: from the town of Chorley.
 Eccles cakes are small, round cakes filled with currants and made from flaky pastry with butter, originally made in Eccles.
 Fag pie: pie made from chopped dried figs, sugar and lard.  Associated with Blackburn and Burnley, where it was the highlight of Fag Pie Sunday (Mid-Lent Sunday).
 Fish and chips: the first fish and chip shop in northern England opened in Mossley, near Oldham, around 1863.
 Frog-i'-th'-'ole pudding: now known as "toad in the hole"
 Frumenty: sweet porridge. Once a popular dish at Lancashire festivals, such as Christmas and Easter Monday.
 Goosnargh cakes: small flat shortbread biscuits with coriander or caraway seeds pressed into the biscuit before baking. Traditionally baked on feast days like Shrove Tuesday.
 Jannock: cake or small loaf of oatmeal. Allegedly introduced to Lancashire (possibly Bolton) by weavers of Flemish origin.
 Lancashire cheese has been made in the county for several centuries. Beacon Fell Traditional Lancashire Cheese has been awarded EU Protected Designation of Origin (PDO) status.
 Lancashire Flat Cake: A lemon flavoured sponge cake, traditionally made with a couple too many eggs, best eaten after being chilled.
 Lancashire oatcake, resembling a large oval pancake, eaten either moist or dried
 Lancashire Sauce, a lightly spiced mustard produced by the Entwistle family of Bury
 "Stew and hard": a beef and cowheel stew with dried Lancashire oatcake
 Nettle porridge: a common starvation diet in Lancashire in the early 19th century. Made from boiled stinging nettles and sometimes a handful of meal.
 Ormskirk gingerbread: local delicacy that was sold throughout South Lancashire.
 Parkin: a ginger cake with oatmeal.
 Pobs or pobbies: bread and milk.
 Potato hotpot: a variation of the Lancashire Hotpot without meat that is also known as fatherless pie.
 Ran Dan: barley bread. A last resort for the poor at the end of the 18th century and beginning of the 19th century.
 Rag pudding: traditional suet pudding filled with minced meat, originating in Oldham.
 Throdkins: a traditional breakfast food of the Fylde.
 Uncle Joe's Mint Balls: traditional mints produced by William Santus & Co. Ltd. in Wigan.

 Cinema Whistle Down the Wind (1961) was directed by Bryan Forbes, set at the foot of Worsaw Hill and in Burnley, and starred local Lancashire schoolchildren.

The tunnel scene was shot on the old Bacup-Rochdale railway line, location 53°41'29.65"N, 2°11'25.18"W, off the A6066 (New Line) where the line passes beneath Stack Lane. The tunnel is still there, in use as an industrial unit but the railway has long since been removed.Funny Bones (1995) was set mostly in Blackpool, after opening scenes in Las Vegas.

Places of interest

The following are places of interest in the ceremonial county:

See also

 Custos Rotulorum of Lancashire - Keepers of the Rolls
 Healthcare in Lancashire
 High Sheriff of Lancashire
 Grade I listed buildings in Lancashire
 Grade II* listed buildings in Lancashire
 Lancashire (UK Parliament constituency) - Historical list of MPs for Lancashire constituency
 Lancashire dialect
 Lancashire Police
 Lancashire Police and Crime Commissioner
 List of collieries in Lancashire since 1854
 List of mining disasters in Lancashire
 Lord Lieutenant of Lancashire
 Scheduled monuments in Lancashire

 Notes 

 References 

Bibliography
 Crosby, A. (1996). A History of Cheshire. (The Darwen County History Series.) Chichester, West Sussex, UK: Phillimore & Co. Ltd. .
 Harris, B. E., and Thacker, A. T. (1987). The Victoria History of the County of Chester. (Volume 1: Physique, Prehistory, Roman, Anglo-Saxon, and Domesday). Oxford: Oxford University Press. .
 Morgan, P. (1978). Domesday Book Cheshire: Including Lancashire, Cumbria, and North Wales. Chichester, Sussex: Phillimore & Co. Ltd. .
 Phillips A. D. M., and Phillips, C. B. (2002),  A New Historical Atlas of Cheshire. Chester, UK: Cheshire County Council and Cheshire Community Council Publications Trust. .
 Sylvester, D. (1980). A History of Cheshire. (The Darwen County History Series). (2nd Edition.) London and Chichester, Sussex: Phillimore & Co. Ltd. .

Further reading
 Farrer and Brownbill, The Victoria history of the county of Lancaster'' Vol 1 (1906); Vol 2 (1908); Vol 3 (1907); Vol 4 (1911); Vol 5 (1911); Vol 6 (1911); Vol 7 (1911); London: Constable.

External links

 
Lancashire On Line Parish Clerk an active project to transcribe and publish records of Births, Marriages and Deaths in Lancashire from the time records began in Edward VIths reign
Traditions of Lancashire, Volume 1 (of 2), by John Roby
Lancashire Lantern, The Lancashire Life and Times E-Resource network
Lancashire Archives' online catalogue - over 1 million descriptions of unique historical documents, accessible to the public, which tell the county's story
Website of the film 'Catch - the hold not taken',  a look at the cultural significance of wrestling in Lancashire
Lancashire County Council – MARIO (Mapping portal)
Map of Lancashire 
Government Office for the North West
North West Regional Minister
Lancashire Online Forums
Images of Lancashire  at the English Heritage Archive
Lancashire Enterprise Zone 

Lancashire
Non-metropolitan counties
Counties of England established in 1182
North West England
NUTS 2 statistical regions of the United Kingdom